Dominic Barker (born 1966) is a British children's author.

Biography
Dominic Barker was born in Southport in 1966. He graduated from the University of Birmingham with a degree in English and then spent two years as part of a comedy double act before deciding to become a teacher.

He currently lives in Barcelona, where he blogs on the city at bigbarcelonablog.blogspot.com and on random other stuff at dominicbarker.blogspot.com.

Bibliography
Mickey Sharp series:
Sharp Stuff (1999)
Sharp Shot (2001)
Sharp Returns (2003)
Sharp Beats (2008)
Blart series:
Blart: The Boy Who Didn't Want to Save the World (2006)
Blart II: The Boy Who was Wanted Dead or Alive - Or Both (2007)
Blart III: The Boy Who Set Sail on a Questionable Quest (2008)
Adam and the Arkonaughts (2010)
Max and Molly's Guide to Trouble(2011)
Max and Molly's Guide to Trouble: How to Catch a Criminal (2011)
Max and Molly's Guide to Trouble: How to Be a Genius (2011)
Max and Molly's Guide to Trouble: How to Build an Abominable Snowman (2012)
Max and Molly's Guide to Trouble: How to Stop a Viking Invasion (summer 2012)

Awards and nominations2000 Sharp Stuff shortlisted for the Branford Boase Award2007 Blart: The Boy Who Didn't Want to Save the World won the Stockton Children's Book of the Year2011' Max and Molly's Guide to Trouble: How to Catch a Criminal'' included in the  Richard and Judy's Children's Book Club

References

External links

Author profile at Bloomsbury.com

Barker's website: www.dominicbarker.com
Barker's Barcelona Blog: An outsider's inside view:  http://bigbarcelonablog.blogspot.com
Barker's random blog:  http://dominicbarker.blogspot.com

English children's writers
English fantasy writers
21st-century English novelists
1966 births
Living people
Alumni of the University of Birmingham
English male short story writers
English short story writers
English male novelists
21st-century British short story writers
21st-century English male writers